Richard Castel (born 31 December 1972, in Vendres) is a former French rugby union player. He played as a Flanker.

Castel played for Stade Toulousain from 1982/83 to 1992/93, where he won 2 titles of the French Championship, in 1994/95 and 1995/96 and a Heineken Cup, in 1995/96. He then moved to Béziers in 1996.

Honours 
 Grand Slam : 1997
 French rugby champion, 1995, 1996 with Stade Toulousain

References

External links
 EspnScrum profile

1972 births
Living people
French rugby union players
Stade Toulousain players
France international rugby union players
Rugby union flankers
Sportspeople from Hérault
AS Béziers Hérault players
French rugby union coaches